Tugdan Airport (Filipino: Paliparan ng Tugdan, Romblomanon (Onhan): Paluparan it Tugdan)  is an airport located in the province of Romblon in the Philippines. It is the only airport in the province of Romblon. The airport is located in Barangay Tugdan in the municipality of Alcantara, from which the airport derives its name.

The airport is classified as a class 2 principal airport by the Civil Aviation Authority of the Philippines, a body of the Department of Transportation.

Airlines and destinations

See also
List of airports in the Philippines

References 

Airports in the Philippines
Buildings and structures in Romblon